Joseph William Anthony Di Chiara (born January 30, 1992) is a Canadian professional soccer player who most recently played as a midfielder for Cavalry FC.

Club career
He played youth soccer with Spartacus soccer club. In 2010, he began his career with the York Region Shooters in the Canadian Soccer League, and in 2011 was signed by Krylia Sovetov Samara, who became interested in him through a connection with his youth coach at Spartacus, Yuri Studin.

Krylia Sovetov
Di Chiara made his Russian Premier League debut for Krylia Sovetov Samara on 18 June 2011 in a game against Terek Grozny.

Kecskemeti
He then moved to Hungary, joining Kecskemeti, but his stint was marred by injury.

Torpedo Moscow
He then returned to Russia, joining FC Torpedo Moscow in the second tier.

Vaughan Azzurri
Di Chiara returned to North America in 2014 to play in the newly formed League1 Ontario with Vaughan Azzurri. He was named L1O Cup MVP during the season, after Vaughan captured the cup, defeating Sigma FC in the final.

Okzhetpes
In February 2015 he signed with Kazakhstan Premier League side Okzhetpes. He made his debut against Astana on March 7.
Di Chiara left Okzhetpes on 1 July 2015.

Second spell at Vaughan
Di Chiara returned once again to Vaughan Azzurri for the 2016 and 2017 League1 Ontario seasons. With the Azzurri, Di Chiara won the 2016 League Cup and 2016 League, as well as Finals MVP, in the championship match against FC London where he helped contribute to all four of his team's goals.

Unionville Milliken
For the 2018 League1 Ontario season, he joined Unionville Milliken SC.

Jonava
In June 2018, Di Chiara signed with A Lyga club FK Jonava. He made his debut on June 20 in a 2–0 loss to Sūduva. With the club set to be relegated, he reached an agreement with the club to release him early from his contract, allowing him to join the Canadian Premier League.

York9
In January 2019, Di Chiara signed with Canadian Premier League club York9 FC. He made his debut for York9 in their inaugural match against Forge FC on April 27, 2019. Di Chiara scored his first goal for York9 on October 12 against Forge, netting a penalty to open the scoring in an eventual 4–0 victory. In October 2020 York9 announced Di Chiara was leaving the club per his own request.

Cavalry FC
On November 20, 2020, Di Chiara signed a multi-year contract with Cavalry FC. In January 2022, it was announced Di Chiara would return for the 2022 season, his second with the club. Cavalry would announce that Di Chiara would leave the club upon completion of the 2022 season.

International career
Di Chiara was called up to the Canadian senior team on September 26, 2011 for Canada's games in the second round of CONCACAF 2014 World Cup Qualification, but did not appear in either match.

Career statistics 
As of October 23, 2022

Honours
Vaughan Azzurri
League1 Ontario First Team All Star: 2016, 2017

References

External links
 
 RFPL profile
 

1992 births
Living people
Association football midfielders
Canadian soccer players
Soccer players from Toronto
Canadian people of Italian descent
Canadian expatriate soccer players
Expatriate footballers in Russia
Canadian expatriate sportspeople in Russia
Expatriate footballers in Hungary
Canadian expatriate sportspeople in Hungary
Expatriate footballers in Kazakhstan
Canadian expatriate sportspeople in Kazakhstan
York Region Shooters players
PFC Krylia Sovetov Samara players
Kecskeméti TE players
FC Torpedo Moscow players
FC Okzhetpes players
FK Jonava players
York United FC players
Cavalry FC players
Canadian Soccer League (1998–present) players
Russian Premier League players
Nemzeti Bajnokság I players
League1 Ontario players
Kazakhstan Premier League players
A Lyga players
Canadian Premier League players
Vaughan Azzurri players
Unionville Milliken SC players